Ali Sadeghzadeh (born 30 November 1978) is an Iranian powerlifter. At the 2012 Summer Paralympics he won bronze medal at the -100 kg category, with 235 kg. He also participated at the 2016 Summer Paralympics, being awarded the bronze medal in the powerlifting competition.

References 

Paralympic bronze medalists for Iran
Paralympic powerlifters of Iran
Powerlifters at the 2008 Summer Paralympics
Powerlifters at the 2012 Summer Paralympics
Powerlifters at the 2016 Summer Paralympics
1978 births
Living people
Medalists at the 2012 Summer Paralympics
Medalists at the 2008 Summer Paralympics
Medalists at the 2016 Summer Paralympics
Paralympic medalists in powerlifting
21st-century Iranian people